Discoverer Enterprise is a fifth generation deepwater double hulled dynamically positioned drillship (ASTANO FPSO design) owned and operated by Transocean Offshore Deepwater Drilling Inc., capable of operating in moderate environments and water depths up to 3,049 m (10,000 ft) using an , 15,000 psi blowout preventer (BOP), and a  outside diameter (OD) marine riser. From 1998 to 2005 the vessel was Panama-flagged and currently flies the flag of convenience of the Marshall Islands.

Discoverer Enterprise has two sister ships, Discoverer Spirit completed in 1999, and Discoverer Deep Seas completed in 2000.

The ship was the first to offer a dual drilling derrick capability.  The dual derricks allowed simultaneous operations to be performed, and according to Transocean increased efficiency by 40 percent.

The US$360 million ship gives its name to the Enterprise Class of large deepwater drillships.

Deepwater Horizon spill response
The ship operates in the Gulf of Mexico under contract to BP. On June 3, 2010, several weeks after the explosion of Deepwater Horizon, Discoverer Enterprise was used to collect oil and gas from the damaged subsea wellhead by lowering a cap connected via a drilling riser over the release, and collecting oil and gas.

See also
Deepwater Horizon oil spill
Thunder Horse Oil Field

References

External links
 Transocean official website
 Discoverer Enterprise — V7HD2 — position and weather  at Sailwx

1998 ships
Deepwater Horizon oil spill
Drillships
Ships built in Spain
Ships of the Marshall Islands
Transocean